Emmanuel Olunkwa (born 1994, Los Angeles, CA) is an artist, writer, designer, editor, and filmmaker. Olunkwa currently serves as the editor of Pin-Up Magazine. In 2020, Olunkwa co-founded November Magazine, E&Ko., and served as an editor of The Broadcast, a virtual publication by the cultural center Pioneer Works. Olunkwa's work has been published in Artforum, Interview, T-Magazine, Architectural Digest, Maharam, Artek, The New York Times, Museum of Modern Art, Curbed, Remodelista, and the New Museum and he is based in New York.

Early life and education 
Olunkwa was born and raised in Los Angeles, CA. He took an interest in photography as a teenager in high school. His affinity for design began by looking at his hometown’s real estate and what elaborate remodels were being done.

In 2014, Olunkwa moved to New York and later graduated with a B.A. in Liberal Arts from the Eugene Lang College at the New School with a concentration in Race, Art History, and Architectural Spatiality. During his final year, Olunkwa served as curatorial intern at MoMA PS1 as well as an editorial intern then editorial assistant at Artforum.

In 2021, he graduated with an M.S. in the Critical, Curatorial, and Conceptual Practices program from Columbia University’s Graduate School of Architecture, Planning, and Preservation, and for his graduate thesis he dissected the spatiality of “Slave Play,” the Tony-nominated production by Jeremy O. Harris about racism and sexual kinks.

Work 
Olunkwa has written features on artists Gaetano Pesce, Kara Walker, David Wojnarowicz, Hito Steyerl, Seth Price, Hamza Walker, John Akomfrah, and Deana Lawson, architects Elizabeth Diller, Mabel O. Wilson, and Mark Wigley, and authors Natasha Stagg, Sarah Schulman, and Andrea Long Chu, amongst others. His photography has been included in Dazed, Garage, Vogue, Cultured, and e-flux and spans across album covers, magazine profiles, and book covers.

Olunkwa was an editor of Pioneer Works gallery's The Broadcast, a virtual publication spanning art, music, science, and technology.

Olunkwa started E&Ko., a functional furniture line of floral-inspired birch plywood chairs and tables, in 2020. The  design works have been shown with artists Walter Price, Michael Krebber, Paul Chan, Wade Guyton, and Rachel Harrison and have been shown at galleries like Greene Naftali in East Hampton, N. Y. He showcased a new capsule collection of design work for SSENSE in fall of 2021.

That same summer, Olunkwa launched November Magazine, a non-profit dedicated to publishing and programming around contemporary art and culture.  The magazine was founded alongside Lauren O'Neill-Butler, and includes Dawn Chan, Aria Dean, and Alec Mapes-Frances as its editors.

In September 2021, Olunkwa was named editor of Pin-Up Magazine, a bi-annual magazine dedicated to architectural entertainment, becoming its second editor ever succeeding its founder, Felix Burrichter, who now serves as the magazine's creative director. “Pin-Up prides itself on its rigorous optimism, so I want to continue complicating what this idea of ‘architectural entertainment’ can mean,” Olunkwa said to The New York Times. The first issue under Olunkwa's leadership centered on the theme of  "Radical optimism."

References

Furniture designers
Photographers from Los Angeles
1994 births
Living people